Rakibul Hasan (born 9 September 2002) is a Bangladeshi cricketer. He made his List A debut for Shinepukur Cricket Club in the 2018–19 Dhaka Premier Division Cricket League on 23 March 2019.

In December 2019, he was named in Bangladesh's squad for the 2020 Under-19 Cricket World Cup. On 21 January 2020, in Bangladesh's match against Scotland, he took a hat-trick. He made his Twenty20 debut on 6 December 2020, for Gazi Group Chattogram in the 2020–21 Bangabandhu T20 Cup.

In February 2021, he was selected in the Bangladesh Emerging squad for their home series against the Ireland Wolves. He made his first-class debut for Dhaka Metropolis in the 2020–21 National Cricket League on 22 March 2021. In December 2021, he was named as the captain of Bangladesh's team for the 2022 ICC Under-19 Cricket World Cup in the West Indies.

References

External links
 

2002 births
Living people
Bangladeshi cricketers
Dhaka Metropolis cricketers
Shinepukur Cricket Club cricketers
Place of birth missing (living people)